Chenar-e Kaliab (also Romanized as Chenār-e Kālīāb; also known as Chenār-e ‘Olyā) is a village in Teshkan Rural District, Chegeni District, Dowreh County, Lorestan Province, Iran. At the 2006 census, its population was 108, in 24 families.

References 

Towns and villages in Dowreh County